The following is a list of works by Rachel Ruysch that are generally accepted as autograph by the Netherlands Institute for Art History and other sources.

Sources

 Rachel Ruysch in the RKD

Rachel Ruysch
Ruysch
Flower paintings